Rachelle Smith Doody is an American neurologist and neuroscientist. She is known for her work on late stage development of drugs for Alzheimer’s disease, Parkinson’s disease, Huntington’s disease and other neurodegenerative disorders.

Education and career
Doody holds a B.A. in English in 1978 and M.A./Ph.D. in Cognitive Anthropology in 1992 from Rice University. She did her medical training at Baylor College of Medicine in Houston, Texas, obtaining her M.D. in 1983. After medical school, Doody took a year of internship in internal medicine at McGill University in Montreal, Canada and then returned to Baylor College of Medicine in Houston she did a residency in Neurology, finishing in 1987. Upon finishing her residency, she began a Ph.D. which she would complete in 1992. At Baylor College of Medicine Doody founded and directed the Alzheimer’s Disease and Memory Disorders Center, was the Effie Marie Cain Chair in Alzheimer’s Disease Research and, as of 2022, she is Distinguished Professor Emeritus. In 2016 she moved to Genentech / Roche where she is the Vice President, Global Head of Neurodegeneration and the Alzheimer's disease and Neurodegeneration Franchise Head in Product Development, Neuroscience at Roche Pharmaceutical Company and its US entity, Genentech.

Doody is primarily known for her work on the diagnosis and treatment of Alzheimer’s disease and related neurodegenerative disorders. For her Ph.D. she worked on cognitive anthropology, which included studying cognition among non-literate Karen hill tribes in Northern Thailand. Some of her early research was on alien hand syndrome where she worked to understand the condition in the brain with people exhibiting the condition. Doody led the phase 2 and 3 development of donepezil, a medication for dementia, and has worked to broaden the diagnosis and treatment of Alzheimer's disease.

Selected publications

Awards and honors
Doody received a Distinguished Alumni Award from Rice University in 2009 and a Distinguished Faculty Award from Baylor College of Medicine in 2011. In 2018 she received a Lifetime Achievement Award from the Clinical Trials in Alzheimer’s Disease Society.

References

Living people
American neurologists
Rice University alumni
Baylor College of Medicine alumni
Baylor College of Medicine faculty
Baylor College of Medicine physicians and researchers
Alzheimer's disease researchers
Women medical researchers
Year of birth missing (living people)